Raorchestes sahai, sometimes known as the Sahai bushfrog or Sahai bush frog, is a frog found by the Noa Dihing river near Gandhigram in Changlang district, Arunachal Pradesh, India.

References

External links
 

sahai
Frogs of India
Endemic fauna of India
Amphibians described in 2006